The Schrottenturn Manor is a manor in Stražišče, a neighborhood of the town of Kranj in northwestern Slovenia. It was built or owned in the 16th century by the Schrott family. In 1902, it was bought by the politician Oto von Detela and became known as the Detela Manor. Since World War II, it has been used as a residential building.

References

Buildings and structures in Kranj
Manors in Slovenia